Thalassia (previously known as Denizli) is a settlement in the Xanthi regional unit of Greece. It is part of the community Toxotes. It is located 4 kilometers southwest of Toxotes and 15.8 kilometers southwest of Xanthi. In 1991, the population of Thalassia was around 365 inhabitants.

External links
Greek Travel Pages - Thalassia
Municipality of Topeiros

Populated places in Xanthi (regional unit)